Sufugawa Dam is a gravity dam located in Shimane Prefecture in Japan. The dam is used for power production. The catchment area of the dam is 88.5 km2. The dam impounds about 53  ha of land when full and can store 10173 thousand cubic meters of water. The construction of the dam was completed in 1961.

References

Dams in Shimane Prefecture
1961 establishments in Japan